Ğäliäsğar Ğäliäkbär ulı Kamaletdinov aka Ğäliäsğar Kamal (Galiaskar  Kamal) was a Tatar writer, dramatist and playwright. Galiaskar Kamal Tatar Academic Theatre is named after him.

Biography
Ğäliäsğar Kamal was born on 6 January 1879 in the family of a furrier craftsman in Kazan. He studied in the Kazan Madrassahs Ğosmaniä and Möxämmadiä in 1889–1897. At the same time he studied the Russian language in a three-years municipal school.

The first play of Kamal was called The Unlucky Youth and it was published in 1900. The history of the Tatar Theater started with staging a play called The Pitiful. He actively participated in the activity of Säyyär troupe as an actor and a playwright.

Literature
The creative activity of G. Kamal gained in scope after 1905, when being impressed by the events of the first Russian revolution, he wrote the plays The First Theater, The Bankrupt and others.

References

External links
 Galiaskar Kamal in Tatar electron library

1879 births
1933 deaths
Tatar people from the Russian Empire
Tatar writers
Tatar dramatists and playwrights
Writers from the Russian Empire
Dramatists and playwrights from the Russian Empire